The Nieuwe Revu  is a weekly general interest magazine from the Netherlands, published on Wednesdays and written in Dutch.

History and profile
In the 1970s the magazine was explicitly left-winged and focused on sport, sex, sensation and socialism.

In July 2014 the magazine was sold by Sanoma to Pijper Media in Groningen.

Editors-in-chief
 1968-1975: Albert Welling
 1975: Jaap Velt
 1975-1977: Ton van Dijk
 1977-1981: Hans Wilbrink, Hans Waleveld, Ger Ackermans
 1981-1982 Fons Burger
 1982-1989: Derk Sauer
 1989-2000: Hans Verstraaten
 2001-2004: Jildou van der Bijl
 2004-2005: Mark Koster
 2005-2006: Hans Verstraaten
 2006-2007: Jan Paul de Wildt
 2007: Fred Sengers
 2007-2010: Altan Erdogan
 2010-2011: Frans Lomans
 2011-2012: Gert-Jaap Hoekman and Willem Uylenbroek
 2012-2015: Erik Noomen
 Since 2015: Marijn Schrijver

Circulation
 1968: 280,000
 1971: 181,000
 1980: 219,000
 1990: 163,374
 2000: 111,084
 2005: 70,208
 2006: 68,562 (-2.3%)
 2007: 64,360 (-6.1%)
 2008: 63,439 (-1.4%)
 2009: 46,619 (-26.5%)
 2010: 40,415 (-1.3%)
 2011: 34,589 (-14.4%)
 2012: 32,529 (-6.0%)
 2013: 23,807 (-26.8%)

References

External links
 Official website

1968 establishments in the Netherlands
Dutch-language magazines
Magazines established in 1968
Political magazines published in the Netherlands
News magazines published in Europe
Socialist magazines
Weekly magazines published in the Netherlands
Weekly news magazines
Mass media in Groningen (city)